À nous les petites anglaises (Let's Get Those English Girls) is a French film directed by Michel Lang, released in 1976.

Synopsis 
In the summer of 1959 two French schoolboys who have failed their English exams are sent on holidays to the South of England. While they are supposed to mainly concentrate on improving their English they also get to know the local population. However it is easier to flirt with the other French schoolgirls.

Production 
The film was shot in Thanet in Kent at Ramsgate where arcades, parks, the Foy Boat, Royal Harbour and the main sands feature throughout the film. Beaches including Botany Bay and Kingsgate Bay were also used and the Port of Dover also features where the boys arrive at the start of the film.

Cast 
 Rémi Laurent as Alain
 Stéphane Hillel as Jean-Pierre
  as Claudie
 Sophie Barjac as Véronique
  as Pierrot
 Françoise Engel
 Martine Sarcey
 Rynagh O'Grady as Doreen
 Aïna Wallé
 Eric Deacon as Mike
 David Morris as Dave

References

External links
 
 
 À nous les petites Anglaises at The New York Times

Thanet
1976 films
1976 comedy films
1970s coming-of-age comedy films
1970s sex comedy films
1970s teen comedy films
Films set in 1959
Films set in England
Films shot in Kent
French coming-of-age comedy films
French sex comedy films
French teen comedy films
Teen sex comedy films
1970s French-language films
Films directed by Michel Lang
1970s French films